Megachile apora is a species of bee in the family Megachilidae. It was described by Krombein in 1953.

References

Apora
Insects described in 1953